Rhine Creek is a stream in Preston County, West Virginia, in the United States.

Rhine Creek was named after the Rhine river, in Europe.

See also
List of rivers of West Virginia

References

Rivers of Preston County, West Virginia
Rivers of West Virginia